Beaver Ranch 163B is an Indian reserve of the Tallcree First Nation in Alberta, located within Mackenzie County. It is 78 kilometres east of High Level.

References

Indian reserves in Alberta